Buen Humor (Spanish: Good Humor) was a satirical and literary magazine published in Madrid, Spain, between 1921 and 1931. It was among the most read satirical magazines in the country during its lifetime in addition to Gutiérrez.

History and profile
Buen Humor was established by graphic artist and cartoonist Pedro Antonio Villahermosa y Borao, who was also called Sileno, in 1921. Sileno also edited the magazine, which covered short stories, sketches and drawings. It was published on a weekly basis. Its headquarters was in Madrid. The magazine ceased publication in 1931.

See also
 List of magazines in Spain

References

External links

1921 establishments in Spain
1931 disestablishments in Spain
Defunct literary magazines published in Europe
Defunct magazines published in Spain
Literary magazines published in Spain
Magazines about comics
Magazines established in 1921
Magazines disestablished in 1931
Magazines published in Madrid
Satirical magazines published in Spain
Spanish humour
Spanish comics titles
Spanish-language magazines
Weekly magazines published in Spain